Johann Bussemacher (fl. c.1580 – 1613) was a German engraver and publisher. Bussemacher was active as an engraver, printer, and art dealer in Cologne from about 1580 to 1613. His many works include several images of saints and a striking plate of Frau Richmuth Rising up from a Terace, taken from a roof painting once in the Basilica of the Holy Apostles, Cologne Church of the Apples.

His name (as "Ian Bussemaker") appears on a set of 13 engravings copied from Heinrich Aldegrever's Labours of Hercules and engraved by Pieter Maes; Bussemaher was presumably their publisher.

References

Sources 

 

German engravers
German printers
German art dealers
Artists from Cologne
16th-century German businesspeople
17th-century German businesspeople
Year of birth unknown
Year of death unknown
Year of birth uncertain
1613 deaths
Businesspeople from Cologne